Galoxestis is a genus of moth in the family Lecithoceridae. It contains the species Galoxestis sarmenta, which is found in China.

References

Natural History Museum Lepidoptera genus database

Lecithoceridae
Monotypic moth genera